Młyniska is a district of the city of Gdańsk, Poland.

Młyniska may also refer to the following villages:
Młyniska, Greater Poland Voivodeship (west-central Poland)
Młyniska, Lublin Voivodeship (east Poland)
Młyniska, Koszalin County in West Pomeranian Voivodeship (north-west Poland)
Młyniska, Myślibórz County in West Pomeranian Voivodeship (north-west Poland)